Phyllidiella backeljaui is a species of sea slug, a dorid nudibranch, a shell-less marine gastropod mollusk in the family Phyllidiidae.

Distribution 
This species was described from Laing Island, Papua New Guinea.

Description
This nudibranch has a pale pink dorsum with white-capped compound tubercles in the middle part, reducing in size to single tubercles at the margin. There are two narrow black lines which run in a wavy pattern between the tubercle groups, joining at the tail. Connecting black lines run across the body and down the sides and there is a narrow black margin to the mantle. The rhinophores are black.

Diet
This species feeds on sponges.

References

Phyllidiidae
Gastropods described in 2007